François-Cyrille Grange (born 1983) is a French alpine skier who competed in the early 2000s.

Biography
He was known for colighting the Olympic Flame with Michel Platini at the 1992 Winter Olympics in Albertville.

Grange's only alpine skiing event was in France in 2000 where he finished 21st in the giant slalom and 40th in the slalom events.

His younger brother is World Champion Jean-Baptiste Grange.

References
1992 Winter Olympics

1983 births
French male alpine skiers
Living people
Olympic cauldron lighters